Television broadcasting in Myanmar began in 1979 as a test trial in Yangon. The first television service BBS was launched on 3 June 1980, followed by regular service in 1981. Most television networks in the country are broadcast from Yangon. MRTV and MWD are the two Burmese state-owned television networks, providing Burmese-language programming in news and entertainment. Other channels include MRTV-4, Channel 7, 5-Plus, MNTV, Channel 9, Mizzima TV, DVB TV, Channel K, YTV, Fortune TV and MITV. Pay TV services include SKYNET and CANAL+ Myanmar.

Digital Terrestrial Television

Pay Television Providers

Most viewed channels

See also 
 Media of Burma

References

 
Mass media in Myanmar